Pope Gregory I (c.540-604), also known as Gregory the Great, was influential in the formation of Catholic doctrine in relation to the Jews. He was responsible for a notable Papal Bull which spoke of a requirement for Christians to protect and defend the Jewish people, which became official doctrine. He publicly disapproved of the compulsory baptism of Jews, and insisted on their right to liberty of action, both in civil affairs and in their worship. In his sermons, he complained of the obduracy of the Jews and their stony hearts.

The position of Jews in society
In various epistles, Gregory insisted on the right of Jews to "liberty of action, so far as the law permitted, both in civil affairs and in the worship of the synagogue" (Epistles 1.34; 2.6; 8.25; 9.38; 9.195; 13.15). But Gregory wrote of limiting the Jews from exceeding the rights granted to them under imperial law - particularly in relation to the ownership of Christian slaves (Epistles 2.6; 3.37; 4.9; 4.21; 6.29; 7.21; 8.21; 9.104; 9.213; 9.215).

Condemnation of forced conversions
In Epistle 1.14, Pope Gregory expressly disapproved of the compulsory baptism of Jews

June 591 : "Censure of Virgil, bishop of Arles, and Theodore, bishop of Marseille, for having baptized Jews by force. They are to desist.

Admonition of Paschasius
November 602 : "Admonition to Paschasius, bishop of Naples, to ensure that the Jews are not disturbed in the celebration of their religious festivals."

References

Judaism
History of the papacy
Gregory I